HMS Witherington was an Admiralty modified W-class destroyer built for the Royal Navy.  She was one of four destroyers ordered in April 1918 from James Samuel White & Co Ltd. under the 14th Order for Destroyers of the Emergency War Program of 1917–18. She was the first Royal Navy ship to carry this name.

The City of Durham adopted HMS Witherington following a successful Warship Week National Savings campaign in February 1942.

Construction 
Witheringtons keel was laid on 27 September 1918 at the James Samuel White & Co. Ltd. Shipyard in Cowes, Isle of Wight.  She was launched on 16 January 1919.  She was 300 feet overall (312 ft between the perpendiculars) in length with a beam of 29.5 feet.  Her mean draught was 9 feet, and would reach 11.25 feet under full load.  She had a displacement of 1,140 tons standard and up to 1,550 full load.

She was propelled by three White-Foster type water tube boilers powering Curtis-Brown geared steam turbines developing 27,000 SHP driving two screws for a maximum designed speed of 34 knots.  She was oil-fired and had a bunkerage of 320 to 370 tons.  This gave a range of between 3500 nautical miles at 15 knots and 900 nautical miles at 32 knots.

She shipped four BL 4.7 in (120-mm) Mk.I guns, mount P Mk.I naval guns in four single centre-line turrets.  The turrets were disposed as two forward and two aft in super imposed firing positions.  She also carried two QF 2 pdr Mk.II "pom-pom" (40 mm L/39) mounted abeam between funnels.  Abaft of the second funnel, she carried six 21-inch torpedo tubes in two triple mounts on the centre-line.

Inter-War years 
Witherington was commissioned into the Royal Navy on 10 October 1919 with pennant number D76.  After commissioning she was assigned to the 3rd Destroyer Flotilla of the Atlantic Fleet.  The flotilla served in Home waters from May 1920 to July 1923 when the Flotilla was transferred to the Mediterranean Fleet.  She was transferred to China Station in 1926.

Also, in 1926 she carried the last Shah of Persia, Ahmad Shah Qajar, into exile, as the old country of Persia was replaced by the country of Iran.  During the Nanking Incident in March 1927, she helped rescue foreign nationals from the Nanking region of China.

In the early 1930s she underwent a refit and was laid-up in Maintenance Reserve at Rosyth as more modern destroyers came into service.  She was reactivated manned by Reservists for a Royal Review at Weymouth in August 1939.  With war looming she was retained in service and brought to war readiness.

Second World War

Early operations 
In September 1939 the ship was allocated to the 15th Destroyer Flotilla based at Rosyth (changed to Liverpool in 1940) in Western Approaches Command for convoy defence. Up to April 1940 she was employed in the North West Approaches area providing local escort for convoys leaving Liverpool (OB series) to a dispersal point in the Atlantic approximately 750 nautical miles west of Lands End.  Periodically an OA (sailing from Southend)series convoy would sail and join up with the OB series.  The merged convoy would change to an OG series (UK to Gibraltar).  During this period she escorted 20 convoys, for a total of 436 ships with total losses of 3 ships (2 sunk by U-boats and 1 due to collision).

In April 1940 she was detached to Scapa Flow after the German invasion of Norway.  From 11 April to 15 April she escorted military convoy NP001 to Narvik then on 24 April she escorted military TM001/1. She provided local escort for the arrival at Clyde for TC004 with two troopships carrying 2,591 troops. At the end of May her pennant number was changed to I76 for visual signalling purposes.  In June she escorted Group 1 (named Hebrew) of the evacuation of Norway from Scapa to the Clyde.

In July 1940 she was returned to the Western Approaches for convoy defence and was mainly employed in the North-West Approach sector as a local escort until February 1942.  During this time she escorted 13 mercantile convoys. On 11 March 1941, she was beached in Portsmouth after sustaining damage from a Luftwaffe air raid, to be later repaired and returned to service.

SRE Conversion 
In late February 1942 she was withdrawn for conversion to a short-range escort (SRE). To augment the earlier changes, the replacement of the after bank of torpedo tubes with a single QF 12 pounder 12 cwt naval gun and the landing of 'Y' gun for additional space for depth charge gear and stowage, a Type 271 centimetric target indication radar was added on the bridge and a Type 286P air warning radar was installed on the main mast.

Western Approaches Command 
Upon completion of the conversion, Witherington was redeployed in the Western Approaches.  During March she was part of the escort force of Convoy Halifax Inbound (HX) 229.  The convoy was under sustained attack during the night of 16–17 March by five U-boats of the Raubgraf Group, two U-boats of the Sturmer Group and one U-boat transiting to home port.  There was no rescue ship assigned to HX229, therefore the escorts were rescuing the survivors of the ten merchant ships that were sunk.  Only two escorts were constantly with the convoy further exposing the convoy to attack.

At the end of June 1943 she was transferred to the Mediterranean-based out of Alexandria in support of follow on convoys for the Allied invasion of Sicily.  In November she was deployed to Gibraltar for Atlantic Convoy Defence.

She was deployed in the South-West Approaches out of Gibraltar throughout 1944.

In 1945 she was deployed to the English Channel area to counter the threat of snorkel equipped U-Boats being concentrated or convoy formation areas.  She remained in this deployment until VE-Day.

Post war

Disposition 
Witherington was paid off into reserve after VE-Day.  She was placed on the disposal list after VJ-Day.  On 20 March 1947 she was sold to Metal Industries for breaking up.  On 29 April while under tow to the breakers yard at Charlestown near Rosyth she parted the tow and was wrecked off the mouth of the Tyne in a gale.

Place of honour 
After the ship was sold for scrap, her ship's bell was retrieved and presented to the City of Durham.  The bell, along with a plaque displaying the ship's crest, were mounted in the City Council Chambers.

Notes

Bibliography
 
 
 
 
 
 
 
 
 
 
 
 
 
 
 Hitler's U-Boat War The Hunters 1939–1942
 Hitler's U-Boat War The Hunted 1942–1945
 Jane's Fighting Ships for 1919

External links 
Service History of HMS Witherington was compiled by the late Lt Cdr Geoffry B. Mason RN and can be found at Naval History Web Site
 U-Boat.net

 

V and W-class destroyers of the Royal Navy
Ships built on the Isle of Wight
1919 ships
World War II destroyers of the United Kingdom
Shipwrecks in the North Sea
Maritime incidents in March 1941
Maritime incidents in 1947